Ximacodes is a genus of moths in the family Limacodidae.

All species of this genus are only known from Madagascar but Ximacodes pyrosoma is also found in Tanzania.

Species
Some species of this genus are:

Ximacodes affinis (Mabille, 1890)
Ximacodes malagasy Viette, 1980
Ximacodes pyrosoma (Butler, 1882)
Ximacodes subrufa (Hering, 1957)

References

Limacodidae genera
Limacodidae
Taxa named by Pierre Viette